Capital Lakefair is a registered 501(c)3 non-profit organization based in Olympia, Washington. While widely known as Olympia’s annual summer festival, Lakefair operates year-round in Thurston County.

The festival is a volunteer driven organization governed by a voting member body known as the Capitalarians, a group of individuals that show their love and dedication to the people of Thurston County by donating their time and effort.

Each year as part of the Scholarship Program, a new group of young women from area high schools join the Lakefair Royalty tradition. The Court participates in all aspects of the organization throughout the season. This includes local activities such as the donation drive by Little Red School House, Special Needs Prom and events held by other area non-profit service groups. They also visit locations across Washington, Oregon and British Columbia as the Lakefair Float rides in parades hosted by other community festivals. Each princess receives a $3,000 scholarship to be applied to any type of higher education, and the selected queen receives an additional $2,000.

Funding for Capital Lakefair is provided by contributions from individuals and businesses in their community, financial and/or in-kind donations by their sponsors and operations from the annual five-day festival in July.

Lakefair was established in 1957 to celebrate the community and continues to be the largest such event in the area.

Lakefair Week 
The annual summer festival takes place at Heritage Park in Olympia, Washington over the 3rd weekend in July. Some events such as the car show and grand parade are held outside of the park and within walking distance.

Scholarship Program and Royal Court
The Royalty tradition began with the first Lakefair in 1957, and the Scholarship Program was established years later in 1975 by Capitalarian Dee Hooper. It continues to be one of the most recognized scholarship programs in the Pacific Northwest and has awarded more than $500,000 in funding to date. The program is currently sponsored by their partners at Olympia Federal Savings.

Members of the Royalty Court participate in all aspects of Capital Lakefair throughout the season. It provides an educational opportunity for participants to learn about themselves, their community and prepare for higher education and adult life. In addition to local events, members visit communities around the Pacific Northwest from Oregon to British Columbia as they travel with the Lakefair Float to other festivals.

Each member of the Court receives a $3,000 scholarship, the Queen an additional $2,000, and remaining candidates $500 each. The funds may be applied to any form of higher education including a traditional degree, trade school or vocational training program.

The process begins with each participating school selecting a representative by December to become their candidate for the Royalty Court. In early February candidates take part in a one-day event that includes a panel discussion, individual interviews with 5 independent judges from the business community and a speech on a predetermined subject. Once complete five young women will be nominated at Coronation to serve on the Court, one of whom is named Lakefair Queen.

References

External links
Lakefair Website

Festivals in Olympia, Washington